3-Nitrochlorobenzene is an organic compound with the formula C6H4ClNO2.  It is a yellow crystalline solid that is important as a precursor to other compounds due to the two reactive sites present on the molecule.

Synthesis
Nitrochlorobenzene is typically synthesized by nitration of chlorobenzene in the presence of sulfuric acid:
C6H5Cl  +  HNO3  →   O2NC6H4Cl  +  H2O

This reaction affords a mixture of isomers. Using an acid ratio of 30/56/14, the product mix is typically 34-36% 2-nitrochlorobenzene and 63-65% 4-nitrochlorobenzene, with only about 1% 3-nitrochlorobenzene. 

Since the above synthetic route does not efficiently produce the 3-isomer, the route most commonly used by chemists is the chlorination of nitrobenzene. This reaction must be carried out with a sublimed iron(III) catalyst at 33-45 °C.

Purification of 3-nitrochlorobenzene is somewhat difficult since other isomers are formed even via chlorination of nitrobenzene, and all of these isomers have similar physical properties. Hydrolysis at the activated chlorine site of the 2- and 4-isomers (but not at the resistant 3-chlorine center) makes separation by physical means much less tedious.

Reactions
Unlike the other isomers of nitrochlorobenzene, the meta isomer is not activated to nucleophilic substitution at the chlorine center. However, 3-nitrochlorobenzene has other interesting reactivity. 3-Nitrochlorobenzene can be reduced to 3-chloroaniline with Fe/HCl mixture, the Bechamp reduction. Electrophilic aromatic substitution is possible on 3-nitrochlorobenzene, yielding many possible products.

Applications
3-Nitrochlorobenzene is not useful itself but is a precursor to other useful compounds. Its derivative 3-chloroaniline, a useful compound sometimes referred to as Orange GC Base.

References

Nitrobenzenes
Chloroarenes